Senecio actinella or Flagstaff ragwort is a perennial herb native to Arizona,  New Mexico, and part of northern Mexico It is an arid land plant, sending up solitary flowering heads on long stalks above a perennial basal mat in ponderosa pine forests.

References

actinella